Novyye Balykly (Yañı Balıqlı) is a rural locality (a selo) in Bakalinsky Selsoviet, Bakalinsky District, Bashkortostan, Russia. The population was 493 as of 2010. There are 3 streets.

Geography 
Novyye Balykly is located 8 km southwest of Bakaly (the district's administrative centre) by road. Starye Balykly is the nearest rural locality.

References 

Rural localities in Bakalinsky District